Henry Bethuel Vincent (December 28, 1872 – January 7, 1941) was a composer and organist. Vincent was the founder of the Erie Playhouse and directed it from 1916 to 1941. Vincent was director of the Erie Philharmonic from 1920 to 1926 after it was reorganized after World War I.

Early life
Vincent was born on December 28, 1872, in Denver, Colorado. He graduated from the Oberlin Conservatory of Music.

References

External links 

1872 births
1941 deaths
Musicians from Denver
Musicians from Erie, Pennsylvania
American male composers
American composers
American conductors (music)
American male conductors (music)
American organists
American male organists
American theatre directors
Oberlin Conservatory of Music alumni
Classical musicians from Pennsylvania